This article contains a list of new French communes created in 2022 (French: communes nouvelles), this is to say a list of new French communes for which prefectural decrees pronouncing their creation defined a date of creation between 1 January 2022 and 31 December 2022.

This list contains 9 new communes regrouping 19 previous communes.

Legislative history 
The law no 2010-1563 of 16 December 2010 to reform local authorities replaced the previous regime of merging communes defined in the "Marcellin" law of 16 July 1971 with a renewed consolidation procedure, resulting in the creation of a "new commune". It was supplemented in 2015 by a new law no 2015-292 of 16 March 2015 relating to the improvement of the regime of the new commune, for strong and lively communes, setting up temporary financial incentives in order to promote the creation of new municipalities before 1 January 2019.

Enumeration

Number of new communes created in 2022 
9 new communes were created on 1 January 2022. They regrouped 19 former communes.

Total number of communes in France 
On 1 January 2022, the French Republic counted 34,955 communes, of which 34,826 are located in metropolitan France and 129 in overseas departments and regions.

Detailed list 
Article L. 2113-6 of the general code of local and regional authorities (CGCT) specifies that "the decree of the representative of the State in the department pronouncing the creation of the new municipality determines the name of the new municipality, if necessary in view of the opinions issued by the municipal councils, fixes the date of creation and in full, in as needed, the terms". The following table presents these indicators for each of the new communes created in 2021: name, date of the prefectural decree announcing its creation, date of creation and multiple modalities (existence of delegated communities, seat of the commune), or complementary information (population).

See also 

 List of new French commune projects
 List of new French communes created in 2015
 List of new French communes created in 2016
 List of new French communes created in 2017
 List of new French communes created in 2018
 List of new French communes created in 2019
 List of new French communes created in 2021
 List of new French communes created in 2023

References 

Lists of new French communes
2022 in France
States and territories established in 2022
2022 establishments in France